Conjugated linoleic acids (CLA) are a family of isomers of linoleic acid.  In principle, 28 isomers are possible.  CLA is found mostly in the meat and dairy products derived from ruminants. The two C=C double bonds are conjugated (i.e., separated by a single bond). CLAs can be either cis-fats or trans-fats.

CLA is marketed as a dietary supplement on the basis of its supposed health benefits.

Biochemistry
CLA describes a variety of isomers of octadecadienoic fatty acids.

Commonly, CLAs are studied as some mixture of isomers wherein the isomers c9,t11-CLA (rumenic acid) and t10,c12-CLA were the most abundant. Studies show however that individual isomers have distinct health effects.

Conjugated linoleic acid is both a trans fatty acid and a cis fatty acid. The cis bond causes a lower melting point and, ostensibly, also the observed beneficial health effects. Unlike other trans fatty acids, it may have beneficial effects on human health. CLA is conjugated, and in the United States, trans linkages in a conjugated system are not counted as trans fats for the purposes of nutritional regulations and labeling. CLA and some trans isomers of oleic acid are produced by microorganisms in the rumens of ruminants. Non-ruminants, including humans, produce certain isomers of CLA from trans isomers of oleic acid, such as vaccenic acid, which is converted to CLA by delta-9-desaturase.

In healthy humans, CLA and the related conjugated linolenic acid (CLNA) isomers are bioconverted from linoleic acid and alpha-linolenic acid, respectively, mainly by Bifidobacterium bacteria strains inhabiting the gastrointestinal tract. However, this bioconversion may not occur at any significant level in those with a digestive disease, gluten sensitivity, or dysbiosis.

Health effects

CLA is marketed in dietary supplement form for its supposed anti-cancer benefit (for which there is no strong evidence or known mechanism, and very few studies conducted so far) and as a bodybuilding aid. A 2004 review of the evidence said that while CLA seemed to benefit animals, there was a lack of good evidence of human health benefits despite the many claims made for it.

Likewise, there is insufficient evidence that CLA has a useful benefit for overweight or obese people as it has no long-term effect on body composition. Although CLA has shown an effect on insulin response in diabetic rats, there is no evidence of this effect in humans.

Dietary sources
Food products from grass-fed ruminants (e.g. mutton and beef) are good sources of CLA and contain much more of it than those from grain-fed animals. Eggs from chickens that have been fed CLA are also rich in CLA, and CLA in egg yolks has been shown to survive the temperatures encountered during frying. Some mushrooms, such as Agaricus bisporus and Agaricus subrufescens, are rare non-animal sources of CLA.

However, dietary punicic acid—which is abundant in pomegranate seeds—is converted to the CLA rumenic acid upon absorption in rats, suggesting that non-animal sources can still effectively provide dietary CLA.

History 
In 1979 CLAs were found to inhibit chemically-induced cancer in mice  and research on its biological activity has continued.

In 2008, the United States Food and Drug Administration categorized CLA as generally recognized as safe (GRAS).

See also
Conjugated fatty acids

References

Aromatase inhibitors
Dietary supplements
Fatty acids